Los Angeles 3:58pm is the second of two 7"'s in Bane's set of "world series" releases. It was released in America on 6131 Records as Los Angeles 3:58pm, in Europe on Hurry Up! Records as Rome 12:58am, and in conjunction with the 1st 7" as a CD in Australia on Resist Records as Perth 7:58am, in Japan on Alliance Trax as Tokyo 7:58am, and in South America on Hurry Up! Records as Curitiba 7:58pm.

Band members
Aaron Bedard - vocals
Aaron Dalbec - guitar
Zach Jordan - guitar
Brendan Maguire - bass
Bob Mahoney - drums

References

External links
6131 Records
Hurry Up! Records
Resist Records
Alliance Trax

Bane (band) albums
2009 EPs